Francis Knollys or Knowles may refer to:

Sir Francis Knollys (the elder) (1514–1596), Treasurer of the Royal Household to Queen Elizabeth I of England
Sir Francis Knollys (admiral) (died 1648), son of above, admiral, MP for Oxford (1575-1589), Berkshire (1604–1611, 1625) and Reading (1640–1648)
Francis Knollys (politician) (c. 1592–1643), son of above, MP for Reading (1624–1629, 1640–1643)
Francis Knollys (died 1754) (c. 1697–1754), British politician, MP for Oxford (1722–1734)
Sir Francis Knollys, 1st Baronet of Thame (c. 1722–1772), MP for Reading (1761–1768)
Sir Francis Charles Knowles, 3rd Baronet (1802–1892), see Knowles baronets
Francis Knollys, 1st Viscount Knollys (1837–1924), Private Secretary to Edward VII of England
Sir Francis Knowles, 5th Baronet (1886–1953), anthropologist
Francis Gerald William Knowles, 6th baronet (1915–1974), biologist

See also
 Sir Charles Francis Knowles, 7th Baronet (born 1951), see Knowles baronets
 Knollys (disambiguation)
 Knowles (disambiguation)